Auguste Arthur Bondy, also known as Scott Bondy and A. A. Bondy, is an American alternative folk artist from Birmingham, Alabama.

Early life

Bondy was born and raised in Mountain Brook, Alabama, where he attended Mountain Brook High School.

Career
Bondy is the former lead singer and guitarist in the rock band Verbena, which he founded in the early-1990s. After the band broke up in 2003, he recorded his debut solo album, American Hearts, in a barn near his home Palenville, New York. The album, released in 2007, marked a shift in musical direction towards a more traditional and minimalist folk sound, with Bondy playing mostly acoustic guitar and harmonica.

His second album, When the Devil's Loose, was recorded in Mississippi and released in September 2009.

Bondy released his third album, Believers, on September 13, 2011.

Bondy released his fourth album, Enderness, on May 10, 2019.

Discography

Albums
 American Hearts (2007)
 When the Devil's Loose (2009)
 Believers (2011)
 Enderness (2019)

In media
 "Killed Myself When I Was Young" was featured in season four of the television series Friday Night Lights and was included on the Friday Night Lights Vol. 2 soundtrack.
 "A Slow Parade" was featured in season six of the television series House.
 "Mightiest of Guns" was featured on season three of the Australian television series Packed to the Rafters.
 "When The Devil's Loose" was featured in "The Tough Man in the Tender Chicken", an episode of the series Bones.
 "There's A Reason" and "False River" were featured in the television show One Tree Hill.
 "World Without End" was featured in season three of the television series Covert Affairs.
 "Skull & Bones" was featured in season four of the television series Shameless.
 "The Heart Is Willing" was sampled at the beginning of season 3, episode 10 of Preacher.

References

External links
 
 A.A. Bondy at MySpace
A.A. Bondy Profile on Music Agency Website

American country singer-songwriters
American male singer-songwriters
American country guitarists
American male guitarists
American alternative country singers
American folk singers
Fat Possum Records artists
Living people
Guitarists from Louisiana
Guitarists from Alabama
Country musicians from Louisiana
Country musicians from Alabama
Year of birth missing (living people)
Singer-songwriters from Alabama
Singer-songwriters from Louisiana